Melody Cooper (née Rowe, born 16 March 1983) is a New Zealand field hockey player. 
She has played in the midfield and defence positions. She played club hockey in New Zealand and in South Australia before representing New Zealand at the 2012 London Olympics. Melody was captain of the SA Suns team that won the Australian Hockey League Championship in 2011.

Personal
Cooper is married to former Adelaide 36ers basketballer David Cooper and lives in Adelaide with their two children.

Field hockey

Player
In 2011, Cooper co-captained the Southern Suns team from South Australia to victory in the Australian Hockey League championship in Darwin.

At the 2012 Summer Olympics, she competed for the New Zealand women's national field hockey team in the women's event. She played under coach Mark Hager where she was part of the team that defeated the Australian Hockeyroos (Australia women's national field hockey team) 1–0 in the opening game and went on to finish fourth.

Coach
Cooper previously coached Adelaide Hockey Club in 2012, 2013 and 2014 in the men's premier league competition in South Australia, culminating in a losing grand final in 2014. 

In 2014, Cooper became the first woman to lead-coach a men's team in the Australian Hockey League with the Southern Hotshots. She was co-head coach with Mark Victory, older brother of Craig Victory. The Hotshots finished eighth.

Recognition
In 2014, she was named as Coach of the Year by Hockey SA in the South Australian Premier League Competition.

References

External links
 

1983 births
Living people
New Zealand female field hockey players
Olympic field hockey players of New Zealand
Field hockey players at the 2012 Summer Olympics
Sportspeople from New Plymouth